Philip Erpff House is a historic home located at Schaefferstown, in Heidelberg Township, Lebanon County, Pennsylvania. It was built about 1750, and is a -story, limestone residence with a gable roof.  It is five bays wide and measures 36 feet, 7 inches, by 26 feet, 6 inches. It features large limestone quoins and a limestone chimney and is in the vernacular Germanic tradition.  Also on the property are a contributing limestone wash house, limestone spring house, and the "Arch."  The Arch is an underground cold storage area.  It has a vaulted ceiling and two niches on the back wall.

It was added to the National Register of Historic Places in 1979.

References

Houses on the National Register of Historic Places in Pennsylvania
Houses completed in 1750
Houses in Lebanon County, Pennsylvania
National Register of Historic Places in Lebanon County, Pennsylvania